Rafael Arlex Castillo  (born June 6, 1980) is a Colombian footballer who plays as a midfielder. He previously played for the former San Antonio Scorpions of the NASL and the Colombia national football team between 2001 and 2003. He is known for his tenacious style of play despite his diminutive stature.

His past clubs include Real Cartagena (Colombia), Independiente Medellín (Colombia), Al-Ahly (Egypt) and Deportivo Pereira (Colombia).

San Antonio Scorpions
Castillo was a mid-season acquisition for the Scorpions. He was brought in between the Spring and Fall 2014 North American Soccer League seasons and immediately started. He played attacking midfield for the Scorpions and helped lead the team to the 2014 NASL Championship. In only half a season, he led the team in goals scored for the entire year.

In the Soccer Bowl 2014, Castillo executed a stunning Bicycle kick to open the scoring. The San Antonio Scorpions would go on to win the game 2-1. Castillo's effort in the final also included an assist to Billy Forbes on a sublime through-ball that split the defense.

He remained with San Antonio until the club ceased operations in December 2015.

San Antonio FC
Castillo signed with 2016 USL expansion club, San Antonio FC on February 4, 2016.

Honours
Independiente Medellín
Categoría Primera A:  2004-I, 2009-II
 MVP Soccer Bowl: 2014

References

External links
 
 
 
 Rafael Castillo in Independiente Medellín Official Website 
 
 

1980 births
Living people
Colombian footballers
Colombia international footballers
Deportivo Pereira footballers
Atlético Nacional footballers
Atlético Bucaramanga footballers
Independiente Medellín footballers
Al Ahly SC players
Millonarios F.C. players
Deportes Quindío footballers
Atlético Huila footballers
Deportes Tolima footballers
Real Cartagena footballers
Llaneros F.C. players
San Antonio Scorpions players
San Antonio FC players
Colombian expatriate footballers
Expatriate footballers in Egypt
Expatriate soccer players in the United States
North American Soccer League players
Egyptian Premier League players
Categoría Primera A players
Association football midfielders
People from Pereira, Colombia